Tweed is a woollen fabric.

Tweed may also refer to:

Places
 Tweed, Ontario, Canada
 Tweed, Ontario (village)
 Tweed, Georgia, U.S.
 Tweed New Haven Airport in New Haven, Connecticut, U.S.
 Tweed Heads, New South Wales, Australia
 Tweed Shire, New South Wales, Australia
 River Tweed, Scotland
 Tweed River (New South Wales)
 Tweed River (New Zealand)

People
 Charles Austin Tweed (1813–1887), American politician and jurist
 Charles H. Tweed (1895–1970), American orthodontist
 David Tweed (fl. from 2000s), Australian businessman
 Davy Tweed (born 1959), Irish rugby player
 George Ray Tweed (1902–1989), US Navy Radioman, holdout in Japan-occupied Guam
 Harrison Tweed (1885–1969), American lawyer and civic leader
 Heather Tweed (born 1959), British visual artist
 Karen Tweed (born 1963), British piano accordionist 
 Martin Tweed (1890–1974), New Zealand rugby player and physician
 Merv Tweed (born 1955), Canadian politician
 Paul Tweed (born 1955), Northern Ireland lawyer
 Shannon Tweed (born 1957), Canadian actress and model
 Tracy Tweed, her sister
 Steven Tweed (born 1972), Scottish footballer and manager
 Sydney Charles Tweed (1886–1942), Canadian businessman and politician
 Thomas Tweed, (1853–1906), Canadian merchant and politician
 Thomas F. Tweed (1890–1940), British soldier and novelist
 William M. Tweed (1823–1878), "Boss Tweed," 19th-century New York politician
Tweed law, a New York State law
 Tweed Roosevelt (born 1942), American businessman, great-grandson of President Theodore Roosevelt

Other uses
 Tweed (Fender), a series of guitar amplifiers
 Tweed Marijuana Inc, now Canopy Growth, a Canadian cannabis company
 , the name of several ships of the Royal Navy

See also
 
 
 Tweed River (disambiguation)